Candalidini is a tribe of lycaenid butterflies in the subfamily Polyommatinae.

Genera
Candalides Hübner, [1819]
Nesolycaena Waterhouse & Turner, 1905
Zetona Waterhouse, 1938

References

 
Butterfly tribes